Pete Kelly's Blues can refer to:

 Pete Kelly's Blues (radio series)
 Pete Kelly's Blues (film), 1955 film based on the radio series
 Songs from Pete Kelly's Blues, soundtrack album of the 1955 film
 "Pete Kelly's Blues" (song), 1955 song introduced in the movie
 Pete Kelly's Blues (TV series), 1959 television series also based on the radio series

See also 
 Peter Kelly (disambiguation)